Hog Run is a tributary of Elk Run in Sullivan County, Pennsylvania, in the United States. The stream is considered to be impaired by atmospheric deposition and metals. Wisconsinan Ice-Contact Stratified Drift, Wisconsinan Till, and bedrock consisting of shale and sandstone occur in the stream's vicinity.

Course
Hog Run begins in a valley in Davidson Township. It flows south for several tenths of a mile and its valley deepens. The stream then turns south-southwest for nearly a mile and the valley continues to deepen. It then turns south and then southwest. After a short distance, it reaches its confluence with Elk Run.

Hydrology
This is approximately 4.97 percent of all the impaired streams in the watersheds of East Branch Fishing Creek and West Branch Fishing Creek. The cause of the impairment is atmospheric deposition and metals.

Hog Run does not attain the stream standards of the Pennsylvania Department of Environmental Protection.

Geography and geology

Hog Run is on bedrock consisting of sandstone and shale for nearly all of its length. However, Wisconsinan Ice-Contact Stratified Drift occurs near the stream's mouth. Wisconsinan Ice-Contact Stratified Drift contains stratified sand and gravel, as well as some boulders. A glacial or resedimented till known as the Wisconsinan Till occurs near the headwaters of the stream.

Watershed
The stream is entirely within the United States Geological Survey quadrangle of Elk Grove.

The streambed of Hog Run is publicly owned. It is one of twenty streams in the Upper Susquehanna-Lackawanna drainage basin whose streambed is public property. The streambeds of the two other named tributaries of Elk Run (Long Run and Gallows Run) are also publicly owned, as is the streambed of Elk Run itself.

History
Elk Run was entered into the Geographic Names Information System on August 2, 1979. Its identifier in the Geographic Names Information System is 1177171.

See also
Long Run (Elk Run), next tributary of Elk Run going downstream
Gallows Run, next tributary of Elk Run going upstream
List of tributaries of Fishing Creek (North Branch Susquehanna River)

References

Rivers of Sullivan County, Pennsylvania
Tributaries of Fishing Creek (North Branch Susquehanna River)
Rivers of Pennsylvania